The 2006 Men's European Water Polo Championship Qualifier was split into three tournaments to determine the last six competing teams for the 2006 Men's European Water Polo Championship, held from September 1 to September 10, 2006 in Belgrade, Serbia.

Group A (France, Slovenia, Slovakia and Malta) played a round robin in Kranj, Slovenia, while Group B (Greece, Netherlands, Poland and Moldova) competed in Eindhoven, Netherlands. Group C was contested in Imperia, Italy with Belarus, Italy, Romania and Turkey. All three events were held from April 7 to April 9, 2006.

Teams

GROUP A — Kranj, Slovenia
 
 
 

GROUP B — Eindhoven, Netherlands
 
 

 

GROUP C — Imperia, Italy

Group A

Friday April 7, 2006 

Saturday April 8, 2006 

Sunday April 9, 2006

Group B

Friday April 7, 2006 

Saturday April 8, 2006 

Sunday April 9, 2006

Group C

Friday April 7, 2006 

Saturday April 8, 2006 

Sunday April 9, 2006

See also
 2006 Women's European Water Polo Championship Qualifier

References
 LEN Magazine (issue 1, May 2006)

Men's European Water Polo Championship
Men
W
W
W
2006
2006
2006